These are tables of members of the California State Legislature (California State Senate and California State Assembly).

Background colors show their stated political party affiliation, according to the following table:

California State Senate

California State Assembly

References

Sources 
 Legislative History - California State Capitol Museum
2016 Election Results- California Secretary of State
 2008 Election Results - California Secretary of State
 2006 Election Results - California Secretary of State
 2004 Election Results - California Secretary of State
 2002 Election Results - California Secretary of State
 2000 Election Results - California Secretary of State
 1998 Election Results - California Secretary of State
 1996 Election Results - California Secretary of State
 JoinCalifornia - an online archive of California election results